The 1160s BC is a decade which lasted from 1169 BC to 1160 BC.

Events and trends
 1166 BC—The start of the Discordian calendar and within Discordianism the date of the Curse of Greyface.
 1162 BC—The statue of Marduk is taken from Babylon by Elamite conquerors.
 1160 BC—Ancient Nubia regains independence from Egypt, after long having served as its vice-royalty since its annexation by Pharaoh Ahmose I.

Significant people
 Ramesses V, Egyptian pharaoh
 Ashur-resh-ishi I, king of Assyria, is born (approximate date).
 Ramesses IX, pharaoh of Egypt, is born (approximate date).
 Ramesses VII, pharaoh of Egypt, is born (approximate date).